Francis Cotton may refer to:
Francis Cotton (politician) (1857–1942), Australian politician
Francis Ridgley Cotton (1895–1960), American bishop
Fran Cotton (Francis Edward Cotton, born 1947), English rugby union prop forward

See also
Francis Lovett Carter-Cotton (1843–1919), Canadian politician
Frank Cotton (disambiguation)
William Francis Cotton (1847–1917), Irish politician